Stonehall is a townland in County Westmeath, Ireland.

Stonehall may also refer to:

 Stonehall (Marshall, Michigan), historic home listed in the National Register of Historic Places listings in Calhoun County, Michigan

Places
Republic of Ireland
Stonehall former name for the parish of Kilcornan Co Limerick.
Stonehall (civil parish), a civil parish in the barony of Corkaree, County Westmeath
Stonehall, County Meath, a townland in Trim civil parish, barony of Lower Moyfenrath, County Meath
Stonehall, County Sligo (aka Carrownageeragh), a townland in Ballysadare civil parish, barony of Leyny, County Sligo